The Italian Alpine Ski Championships are the national championships in alpine skiing, organised every year by the Federazione Italiana Sport Invernali (FISI).

Results
All restults up to 2017 edition.

Men

Women

See also
Italian Winter Sports Federation

References

External links
  

Alpine skiing competitions in Italy
Recurring sporting events established in 1931
National alpine skiing championships
Alpine